Catherine Jane Prowd, known as Kate Prowd, is an Australian bishop in the Anglican Church of Australia. She has served as an assistant bishop in the Anglican Diocese of Melbourne, as the Bishop for the Oodthenong Episcopate (which serves the northern and western areas of Melbourne as well as the city of Geelong), since October 2018.

Prowd is the sister of Bishop Lindsay Urwin. They are believed to be the only brother-sister bishops in the entire Anglican Communion. Another brother is Michael Urwin, who was headmaster of Brighton Grammar School from 1996 to 2013 and has been the registrar of the Diocese of Melbourne since 2019.

Prowd completed a theological degree at Trinity College, Melbourne. She was ordained deacon in 1986 and priest in 1992. She served in parish ministry within the Diocese of Melbourne at Mount Waverley, Black Rock, Hampton and Gardenvale and in school chaplaincy at Christ Church Grammar School and Brighton Grammar School.

Prowd also lived in New Zealand for some time where she worked as a clinical psychologist in student health at Otago University before returning to Australia in 2004. She has maintained her registration as a psychologist in her role as bishop.

In 2018, Prowd was consecrated and appointed as an assistant bishop in the Diocese of Melbourne, replacing Philip Huggins who had reached retirement age.

Prowd is married to Roger, who is a priest, and has three daughters.

References

People educated at Trinity College (University of Melbourne)
1960 births
21st-century Anglican bishops in Australia
Assistant bishops in the Anglican Diocese of Melbourne
Living people
Women Anglican bishops
University of Divinity alumni
Clergy from Melbourne
21st-century Australian women